Brobdingnag is a fictional land, which is occupied by giants, in Jonathan Swift's 1726 satirical novel Gulliver's Travels. The story's main character, Lemuel Gulliver, visits the land after the ship on which he is travelling is blown off course. As a result, he becomes separated from a party exploring the unknown land. In the second preface to the book, Gulliver laments that the publisher misspelled the land's name, which Gulliver asserts is actually called Brobdingrag.

The adjective "Brobdingnagian" has come to describe anything of colossal size.

Location
Swift describes the location of Brobdingnag and its geography in Part II of Gullivers Travels and provides a map showing where it is. However, the accounts are somewhat contradictory.

The map printed at the beginning of Part II indicates that Brobdingnag is located on the northwest coast of North America, in probably what is now British Columbia. The map shows (from south to north) Point Monterey, Port Sir Francis Drake, Cape Mendocino, Cape St. Sebastian, Cape Blanco and the semi-mythical Strait of Anián, all locations on the Pacific coast of North America, and depicts Brobdingnag as a peninsula extending west into the Pacific to the north of the Straits.

In the book, Gulliver describes his voyage from England. After wintering at the Cape of Good Hope, the ship reached a latitude of five degrees south, northward of Madagascar in March 1703, and the Moluccas, "about three degrees northwards of the line" in April. From there, a storm drives the ship "about five hundred leagues to the east" (this would place the ship still in Micronesia), after which the crew determine to "hold on the same course rather than turn more northerly, which might have brought us to the north-west parts of Great Tartary". They sighted land, which Gulliver later discovers is Brobdingnag, on 16 June 1703.

Contrariwise, his map shows Brobdingnag to be of a similar size and extent as the present-day Washington, and his description of the voyage puts it at a six-week voyage from the Moluccas.

Swift was highly sceptical about the reliability of travel writings, and the unlikely geographic descriptions parody many unreliable travel books published at the time which Percy Adams describes as "travel lies".

Scale

Gulliver states that a nine-year-old girl named Glumdalclitch, who teaches him the language, stands "not above 40 feet tall, being small for her age". In at least two cases, he states explicitly that a Brobdingnagian's eyes are "above sixty feet" from the ground, giving a ratio of at least eleven to one. He also states that he would "appear as inconsiderable to this nation as a Lilliputian would be among us", indicating the same twelve to one ratio given for Lilliput was intended. This is further reinforced by hailstone being almost 1,800 times as heavy as in Europe (with 1/12 ratio, it should be 1,728). The queen's court dwarf, the shortest native on record, is not quite thirty feet tall, which, on a 1/12 scale, would make him equivalent to a person a bit below thirty inches, the height of the Chinese dwarf He Pingping. Gulliver also describes visiting the chief temple in Lorbrulgrud, whose tower was the highest in the kingdom, but reports he "came back disappointed, for the height is not above three thousand foot", which "allowing for the difference in size between those people and us in Europe" is "not equal in proportion to Salisbury steeple". Outside world whales are stated to be of a size that one man can barely carry, and are eaten by common folk if they find a beached specimen.

Geography
Brobdingnag is said to be located between Japan and California, extending six thousand miles in length, and between three and five thousand miles in breadth. It is surrounded on three other sides by the ocean, and the people have never been able to develop ocean-going ships. The land "has 51 cities, near 100 walled towns, and a great number of villages".
Lorbrulgrud is claimed to be the capital with the king having a seaside palace at Flanflasnic. The capital "contains above 80,000 houses" and "is in length three glonglungs (about fifty four English miles) and two and a half in breadth".
Gulliver tells us that Lorbrulgrud was "situated near the middle of that empire" and was three thousand miles distant from the farmer's house on the coast, that the journey took ten weeks and that they "crossed five or six rivers many degrees broader and deeper than the Nile or the Ganges", and "there was hardly a rivulet smaller than the Thames at London Bridge".

People, flora and fauna 

The people of Brobdingnag are described as giants who are as tall as 60 feet high and whose stride is ten yards. All of the other animals and plants, and even natural features such as rivers and even hail, are in proportion. The rats are the size of mastiffs, with tails "two yards long, wanting an inch", while mastiffs are "equal in bulk to four elephants". Gulliver describes flies "as big as a Dunstable lark", and wasps the size of partridges, with stings "an inch and a half long, and sharp as needles". This also means that the country is far more dangerous for people of normal human size, as evidenced by Gulliver using his hanger far more often here—namely, on attacking vermin—than in any other of the strange countries he visited, but the people are civilised. Fossil records are claimed to show that the ancestors of the Brobdingnagians were once even larger, likely as an allusion to the medieval tendency of supporting similar claims with bones that had, around Swift's time, started being identified as belonging to elephants, mastodons and even whales. The King of Brobdingnag argues that the race has deteriorated. The language of Brobdingnag is depicted as being of a character distinctively different from that of Lilliput.

History and government 
Gulliver relates that, in the past, there were battles between the monarchy, nobility, and people resulting in a number of civil wars ending in a treaty. The monarchy is based on reason. City officials are elected by ballot. The King of Brobdingnag finds English institutions and behaviour wanting in comparison with his country's. Based on Gulliver's descriptions of their behaviour, the King describes the English as "the most pernicious race of little odious vermin that nature ever suffered to crawl upon the surface of the earth". Swift intended the moral relationship between the English and Brobdingnagians to be as disproportionate as the physical relationship. The King of Brobdingnag is considered to be based on Sir William Steele, a statesman and writer, whom Swift worked for early in his career. Some critics believed it to be based on Sir William Temple.

The army of Brobdingnag is claimed to be large with 207,000 troops including 32,000 cavalry although the society has no known enemies. The local nobility commands the forces; firearms and gunpowder are unknown to them. The King scolds Gulliver when he tries to interest the statesman in the use of gunpowder.

The laws of Brobdingnag are simple and easy to follow. There is little civil litigation. Murderers are beheaded.

In Gulliver's in-character preface to the story, headed A letter from Captain Gulliver to his cousin Sympson, he specifies that the correct spelling is in fact "... Brobdingrag (for so the word should have been spelt, and not erroneously Brobdingnag), ... [emphasis added]". This correction by the fictional author is a device used to add an element of verisimilitude to the story.

Culture 
Brobdingnagian culture consists of history, poetry, mathematics and ethics, mathematics being a particular strength. Printing has been long known but libraries are relatively small. The king has the largest library, which contains about one thousand volumes. The Brobdingnagians favour a clear literary style.

Legacy

The land is the subject of James Gillray's satirical hand-coloured etching and aquatint print, titled The King of Brobdingnag and Gulliver.–Vide. Swift's Gulliver: Voyage to Brobdingnag. Produced in 1803, it shows a profile of George III of the United Kingdom, representing the Brobdingnagian king, holding a miniature Napoleon, representing Gulliver, while observing him through a spyglass. It was published on 26 June, five weeks after the breakdown of the Treaty of Amiens, which precipitated the Napoleonic Wars. The king's speech balloon in the top half of the print reads "My little friend Grildrig, you have made a most admirable panegyric upon Yourself and Country, but from what I can gather from your own relation & the answers I have with much pains wringed & extorted from you, I cannot but conclude you to be one of the most pernicious, little-odious-reptiles, that nature ever suffer'd to crawl upon the surface of the Earth".

On Mars's largest moon, Phobos, the crater Grildrig is named because of Swift's 'prediction' of the two then undiscovered Martian moons, which his Laputan astronomers had discovered.

See also 

 Island gigantism
 Houyhnhnm
 Lilliput and Blefuscu
 Struldbrug
 Yahoo (Gulliver's Travels)

Notes

References

Bibliography 
 "Jonathan Swift." Concise Dictionary of British Literary Biography, Volume 2: Writers of the Restoration and Eighteenth Century, 1660–1789. Gale Research, 1992. Reproduced in Biography Resource Center. Farmington Hills, Michigan: Thomson Gale. 2005.
 Manguel, Alberto; and Gianni Guadalupi. "Brobdingnag", The Dictionary of Imaginary Places, Harcourt Brace, New York, 2000.

External links 
 A voyage to Brobdingnag
 Imaginary countries: Brobdingnag

Fictional elements introduced in 1726
Fictional North American countries
Peninsulas
Gulliver's Travels locations
Fiction about giants
Giants in popular culture
Satire